"Love Is Love Is Love" (stylized as "LovE Is LovE Is LovE") is a song recorded by American singer LeAnn Rimes, and the fourth release from her sixteenth studio album, Remnants. She co-produced it with Darrell Brown, Mark Batson and Niko Bolas, and co-wrote it with Brown, Lindy Robbins and Toby Gad. It plays in the 2017 American film Logan Lucky, in which Rimes has a cameo.

Background
The single celebrates the LGBTQ community, as Rimes has been a longtime supporter. In an interview with Us Rimes explained the message behind the song: "A ‘Pride’ celebration is a living thing. It is breathing authenticity. It's a space we hold for one another, a place to come into what our souls move us to be, it's a place in love and only love,” adding “That’s why the LGBTQ community continues to inspire me and enliven my spirit every time I perform for them."

Chart performance
The single became her third number one on the Billboard Dance Club Songs chart dated August 5, 2017, and her second number one in 2017, as "Long Live Love" previously reached the top spot in March of that year. It is also Rimes's third single to reach number one on the chart after "What I Cannot Change" in 2009.

In an interview with Billboard about the song reaching number one, Rimes commented "It is such an honor to have the DJs, clubs and fans welcoming me this way. I have loved and will always love club and dance music. When 'Long Live Love' went to No. 1, it was extremely exciting, but to have 'LovE Is LovE Is LovE' go No. 1, well, it brings out so many emotions in me. The message of supporting across-the-board global equality is dear to me and I know to so many others in the club world. A big thank you to the remixers for always bringing out a fresh viewpoint to my songs. It was very fun and intense to re-record my vocals at different tempos for the remixes."

Track listing

Charts

Release history

References

External links
 Official Video at YouTube

2016 songs
2017 singles
LGBT-related songs
LeAnn Rimes songs
RCA Records singles
Sony Music singles
Songs written by LeAnn Rimes
Songs written by Darrell Brown (musician)
Song recordings produced by Mark Batson
Songs written by Toby Gad
Songs written by Lindy Robbins
Song recordings produced by Niko Bolas